Lunar Sample 15016, better known as the "Seatbelt Basalt", is a lunar sample discovered and collected on the Apollo 15 mission in 1971 in the Hadley-Apennine region of the Moon. The rock is a  vesicular olivine basalt.

It is so named because mission commander, David Scott, noticed it on the surface while driving the Lunar Roving Vehicle and stopped to collect it, but said to mission control that he was just fastening his seatbelt. He did this because he assumed mission control would not give permission to stop for a sample collection due to time constraints.

The sample is a very vesicular basalt, rounded by surface erosion. Lithologically, it closely resembles samples 15535 and 15536, as well as a number of fragments in the rake samples from station 9A.

The seatbelt basalt is currently stored at the Lunar Sample Laboratory Facility at the Lyndon B. Johnson Space Center.  A piece of it is on display at the National Air and Space Museum in Washington, DC.

Description

The seatbelt basalt is a highly-vesicular, olivine-normative, basalt with phenocrysts of zoned pyroxene and olivine within a matrix of pyroxene and plagioclase.  The rock also contains ilmenite and ulvöspinel.

Age

The rock's cosmic ray exposure age was discovered to be about 285 million years.  Another study determined the age to be 315 million years.

The rock's age of formation has been estimated to be approximately 3.29 ± 0.05 billion years from Rb-Sr radiometric dating.

References

External links
Sample 15016

Apollo 15
Lunar science
Lunar samples
David Scott
Basalt
Imbrian